Game Show Network (GSN) is an American basic cable channel owned by Sony Pictures Television. The channel's programming is primarily dedicated to game shows, including reruns of acquired game shows, along with new, first-run original and revived game shows. The network has also previously aired reality competition series and televised poker.

As of October 2019, Game Show Network claimed that it was available to "nearly 75 million" households in America, primarily through traditional cable and satellite services. The network and its original programming are also available on streaming and Internet television services, including Frndly TV, YouTube TV, Philo, fuboTV, Sling TV, Plex, and Pluto TV.

History

1994–2004: As "Game Show Network"
On May 7, 1992, Sony Pictures Entertainment joined forces with the United Video Satellite Group to launch the Game Show Channel, which was set to begin in 1993. The announcement of the channel was made by SPE president Mel Harris.

On December 2, 1992, Sony Pictures Entertainment made a deal to acquire the Barry & Enright game show library, and in a separate deal, struck a 10-year licensing agreement for the rights to the Mark Goodson game show library of more than 20,000 episodes including among others, What's My Line?, Family Feud, and To Tell the Truth. Upon the deal, Sony said it would sell an equity stake in the network to Mark Goodson Productions, including the production of new original series by Jonathan Goodson Productions. Both deals were completed on December 7, 1992, eleven days before Mark Goodson's death. On June 6, 1994, Mark Goodson Productions pulled out of the venture. GSN's launch time was intended to be at 10:00 p.m. ET, but at the time, it was pushed back to 7:00 p.m. ET.

Game Show Network launched at 7:00 p.m. on December 1, 1994. The first aired game show to be on GSN was What's My Line?. By the launch date, the network had secured rights to over 40,000 episodes from the libraries of several game show production companies and corporate parent Sony. The initial lineup was exclusively acquired programming such as Match Game, Family Feud, The Newlywed Game, Jeopardy!, and Wheel of Fortune. The network eventually began producing original game shows such as Lingo, Burt Luddin's Love Buffet, Whammy!, Inquizition, and Extreme Gong. Faux Pause is an American television program that aired in 1998 on Game Show Network. Co-hosted by Mary Gallagher and Sean Donnellan, Pause consisted of jokes and skits done while watching certain episodes of game shows, in a similar fashion to Mystery Science Theater 3000.

In 2001, a massive change in both leadership and programming at the network took place when Liberty Media acquired a 50% stake. Both president Michael Fleming and vice president Jake Tauber departed, and former ABC Family/Fox Family Channel president Rich Cronin was hired to head the network.

2004–2018: As "GSN"
On March 15, 2004, Game Show Network began using the abbreviation "GSN" and introduced the tagline "The Network for Games." GSN began expanding its programming to include reality television games and various competition-based programs. GSN would also air reruns of reality competitions (for example, Spy TV and The Mole). Along with its new format, GSN would continue to produce traditional game shows, including new seasons of Lingo and a revival of Chain Reaction.

David Goldhill succeeded Rich Cronin as GSN president on August 1, 2007. A high definition simulcast feed of the network was launched on September 15, 2010.

Some notable acquisitions for the network included Who Wants to Be a Millionaire and the Steve Harvey-hosted Family Feud, both of which would headline the network's prime time lineup. Notable original game shows produced during this time were Catch 21 (which would be revived in 2019), Baggage (hosted by Jerry Springer), the first U.S. incarnation of The Chase, American Bible Challenge (the premiere of which drew an audience of nearly two million viewers), and Skin Wars (which would later move to Syfy). The network produced interactive program blocks, such as GSN Live and Playmania.

In March 2011, DirecTV (which by this point had taken over Liberty Media's then-65% stake in the network) sold a 5% stake in the network back to Sony Pictures Entertainment. Although DirecTV nominally remained the majority owner, it had ceded control of the network to Sony, and had the right to force Sony to increase its stake in GSN to 58%. On November 8, 2012, DirecTV sold an 18% interest in GSN to Sony. GSN partnered with Vubiquity to launch "GSN On Demand" on August 15, 2013.

2018–present: Return to "Game Show Network" 

In April 2017, David Goldhill stepped down after nearly 10 years as GSN president, the longest tenure for any president to date. He was succeeded by Mark Feldman in August 2017. Later that year, the network would begin to refer to itself in promos by its full name. By 2018, the network's programming returned to focus on traditional game show formats, culminating in a rebranding that restored the network's full name.

The network's daily schedule would consist almost entirely of original programming, including new shows like America Says, Common Knowledge, and People Puzzler. In April 2020, Game Show Network re-introduced Master Minds, a retool of an earlier original show called Best Ever Trivia Show featuring Jeopardy! champion Ken Jennings, and now hosted by the returning Brooke Burns of the GSN version of The Chase.

DirecTV's stake in Game Show Network would move to AT&T when it acquired the service in 2015. On November 18, 2019, it was announced that Sony had acquired AT&T's 42% stake and thus resumed full ownership of GSN. A list of 2020 Nielsen ratings published by Variety indicated that Game Show Network averaged 432,000 viewers in prime time, up 6% from the 2019 average.

In December 2021, Mark Feldman resigned after four years as Game Show Network president, to join the video game firm Scopely amid the gaming unit sale from Sony. He was succeeded by longtime executive John Zaccario. 

On September 7, 2022, Dish Network and Sling TV removed Game Show Network from their lineups, after failing to reach a renewal agreement with owner Sony Pictures Television. The network returned to both services on September 27, 2022.

Programming

Current original programming, as of March 2023, includes Master Minds, America Says, Switch, Tug of Words, People Puzzler, and Chain Reaction. Other shows airing on the network include Catch 21, Match Game (Rayburn), Family Feud (Harvey), Deal or No Deal, Funny You Should Ask (2017), 25 Words or Less, Cash Cab, and the 2016 version of The $100,000 Pyramid.

Syndication and digital streaming
GSN began syndicating some of its original programming to other channels in the early 2010s. On June 24, 2013, the channel entered into an agreement with Bounce TV, giving it the broadcast rights to The Newlywed Game, Catch 21, and The American Bible Challenge. The American Bible Challenge aired in reruns on UP in fall 2013 and again in spring 2015. Drew Carey's Improv-A-Ganza aired on Laff in 2015. Reruns of America Says aired in syndication during the 2019–20 season.

In March 2020, the network launched Game Show Central, a digital streaming channel broadcasting archived original programming. The network is currently available on Samsung and Vizio smart television sets and Paramount Global-owned AVOD platform Pluto TV (which also carries rival network Buzzr). Game Show Central features both current GSN originals like America Says and older shows such as Cram, Friend or Foe?, Minute To Win It, and Baggage. The Roku Channel picked up the service (with a somewhat different schedule and roster of shows compared to the Pluto TV stream) later in 2020. The service was made available globally via Plex in late July 2020.

Online gaming
In 2007, Liberty Media acquired the Toronto-based FUN Technologies, operator of the popular online tournament casual game website WorldWinner. Following the acquisition, Liberty began to extend the GSN brand into online gaming by re-branding WorldWinner as a GSN service. GSN also launched a social gaming app on Facebook, now known as GSN Casino, featuring skill and casino games along with competitive tournaments. By October 2010, GSN Casino had over 8 million active users. GSN also developed a Wheel of Fortune app for Facebook, released in 2010.

GSN also published GSN Casino mobile apps, featuring various slot machine and bingo games in 2013, GSN Casino was the 10th highest-grossing app for iPad on the App Store. In January 2014, GSN acquired Bitrhymes Inc., developers of the social and mobile games Bingo Bash and Slots Bash, for an undisclosed amount. GSN had sued Bitrhymes in November 2013 following its prior offer to acquire the company, arguing that it had attempted to back out of its offer and accept a different one during GSN's exclusive negotiation period.

In November 2014, the network announced that a show based on Bingo Bash was in development for Game Show Network's 2015 slate of original programming.

In October 2021, Sony sold the GSN Games subsidiary to mobile game developer Scopely in a $1 billion cash and stock deal. Sony will take a minority stake in Scopely.

See also
 Buzzr⁣ – a digital multicast network showcasing vintage game shows.
 Challenge⁣ – a British channel devoted to airing game shows and competition-based programs.
 GameTV⁣ – a Canadian channel that airs game shows and general entertainment programming.
 Nickelodeon Games and Sports for Kids⁣ – a now-defunct channel that aired Nickelodeon-produced game shows.
 The Game Channel⁣ – a Philippine channel focused on family game shows and reality shows.

References

External links
 

Television networks in the United States
Sony Pictures Television
Former AT&T subsidiaries
Television channels and stations established in 1994
English-language television stations in the United States
Game shows
1994 establishments in California